Hamburg is an unincorporated community in Fairfield County, in the U.S. state of Ohio.

History
Hamburg was laid out around 1812 on the Zane's Trace. The community was named after the German city of Hamburg. A post office called Hamburg was established in 1859, and remained in operation until 1905.

References

Unincorporated communities in Fairfield County, Ohio
Unincorporated communities in Ohio